Athol Springs is a hamlet in the town of Hamburg in Erie County, New York, United States.

Notable people
The family of feminist activist Katharine Martha Houghton Hepburn owned property in Athol Springs.

Athol Springs is the birthplace of retired National Football League quarterback Jim Kubiak.

New York Giants head coach Brian Daboll graduated from Saint Francis High School.

References

External links
 Railroad Stations

Hamlets in New York (state)
Hamlets in Erie County, New York